Sartorius may refer to:
Sartorius (surname)
 Sartorius muscle, a long thin muscle that runs down the length of the thigh
 Sartorius Point on Viskyar Ridge, Antarctica
 Mr. Sartorius, a character in G.B. Shaw's Widowers' Houses
 Sartorius (Yu-Gi-Oh! GX), a fictional character in the anime television series
 Dr. Alex Sartorius, alias Doctor Phosphorus, in the DC comic universe
 Sartorius, a character in Stanislaw Lem's Solaris
 Sartorius AG, a pharmaceutical and laboratory equipment manufacturer
 "Sartorius", a song by Goldfrapp
 Doctor Erasmus Sartorius, one of the characters in the video game Zork: Nemesis